The  is a Shinto shrine in Kyoto. This shrine is known and popular for its gardens and many trees.

History
The shrine was established in the year 794 by Emperor Kammu when the capital was transferred to Heian-kyō from Nagaoka-kyō. From the earliest years, the shrine has been often visited by members of the Imperial family. In earlier centuries, the shrine also enjoyed a special relationship with both the Genji and the Heike.

The shrine became the object of Imperial patronage during the early Heian period. In 965, Emperor Murakami ordered that Imperial messengers were sent to report important events to the guardian kami of Japan. These heihaku were initially presented to 16 shrines including the Hirano Shrine.

The shrine has been the site of a cherry blossom festival annually since 985. The long history of festivals at the Shrine began during the reign of Emperor Kazan, and it has become the oldest regularly held festival in Kyoto. Each year, the festival begins in the morning with a ceremony at the mausoleum of former Emperor Kazan.  In the afternoon, a procession travels from the shrine into the neighboring area and back.

Om 26th August 2018, the shrine suffered extensive damage from Typhoon Jebi, which it has struggled to recover from. The haiden was destroyed, as well as a few trees around the shrine.

The enshrined kami includes:

See also
 List of Shinto shrines
 Twenty-Two Shrines
 Modern system of ranked Shinto Shrines

Notes

References
 Breen, John and Mark Teeuwen. (2000).  Shinto in History: Ways of the Kami. Honolulu: University of Hawaii Press. 
 Ponsonby-Fane, Richard. (1962).   Studies in Shinto and Shrines. Kyoto: Ponsonby Memorial Society. OCLC 399449
 . (1959).  The Imperial House of Japan. Kyoto: Ponsonby Memorial Society. OCLC 194887

External links
 Official website 

Beppyo shrines
Kanpei-taisha
8th-century Shinto shrines
Shinto shrines in Kyoto
Important Cultural Properties of Japan
Religious buildings and structures completed in 794